Zero Hour! is a 1957 drama film directed by Hall Bartlett from a screenplay by Bartlett, Arthur Hailey, and John Champion. It stars Dana Andrews, Linda Darnell, and Sterling Hayden and features Peggy King, Elroy "Crazy Legs" Hirsch, Geoffrey Toone, and Jerry Paris in supporting roles. It was released by Paramount Pictures.

Zero Hour! was a remake of the Canadian television play Flight into Danger, and was in turn used as the basis for the parody film Airplane!

Plot
During the closing days of the Second World War, six members of the Royal Canadian Air Force fighter squadron led by pilot Ted Stryker are killed because of a command decision he made. Years later, in civilian life in Winnipeg, Manitoba, a guilt-stricken Stryker goes through many jobs, and his marriage is in trouble.

Stryker finds a note at home: his wife Ellen has taken their young son Joey and is leaving him, flying to Vancouver. He rushes to Winnipeg Airport to board the same flight, Cross-Canada Air Lines Flight 714. He asks his wife for one last chance, but Ellen says that she can no longer love a man she does not respect.

Stewardess Janet Turner begins the meal service, offering meat or fish as the choices.  When a number of passengers and the co-pilot begin feeling sick, a doctor aboard determines that the fish is the cause. The pilot also becomes seriously ill and cannot fly the airplane. Before he passes out, he turns on the autopilot.

The stewardess determines that Stryker is the only passenger with flying experience, but he has not flown in 10 years and has never piloted an aircraft of this size. Owing to dense fog, Flight 714 cannot land at Calgary and any other airport east of the Canadian Rockies, but must continue on to Vancouver.

Stryker's superior in the war, the tough-minded Captain Treleaven, is summoned to Vancouver Airport. Treleaven blames Stryker for the wartime deaths and has no faith in him. However, he has no choice but to work with him, getting him familiarized with the airplane and teaching him how to land. Ellen joins her husband in the cockpit to handle the radio.

As they approach Vancouver, it is shrouded in fog. Treleaven orders him to circle, for hours if necessary, in the hope that it will lift, but Stryker decides to try to land immediately because passengers will die if they do not get medical treatment soon. Stryker makes a rough landing, but none of the passengers are injured. He has conquered his demons and regained the respect of both Ellen and Captain Treleaven.

Cast

 Dana Andrews as Squadron Leader Ted Stryker
 Linda Darnell as Ellen Stryker
 Sterling Hayden as Captain Martin Treleaven
 Elroy "Crazylegs" Hirsch as Captain Bill Wilson, Pilot
 Geoffrey Toone as Dr. Baird
 Jerry Paris as Tony Decker
 Peggy King as Stewardess Janet Turner
 Charles Quinlivan as Harry Burdick

Production

Writing
Zero Hour! was an adaptation of Hailey's original 1956 Canadian Broadcasting Corporation teleplay Flight into Danger, starring James Doohan as George Spencer, the original name for the Stryker character. Hailey also co-wrote a novel with John Castle based on the same plot titled Flight Into Danger: Runway Zero-Eight (1958), although this is based more closely on the television version than on the film.

Filming
Principal photography took place from May 8–28, 1957, with retakes on July 23–24, 1957. The primary filming location was Santa Ana, California. Nightclub and television performer Peggy King made her feature film debut in Zero Hour!, recording the song "Zero Hour" for Columbia Records to coincide with the film's release.

John Ashley has a small role appearing on television as a pop star, although the vocals were provided by Duke Mitchell.

Reception
The New York Times reviewer Bosley Crowther called Zero Hour! an "exciting contemplation of a frightening adventure in the skies" based on a "good terse script ... Dana Andrews as the hero and Sterling Hayden as the captain are first-rate in these roles, keeping them hard and unrelenting."  Time magazine, however, called the script a "bloopy inflation of a 1956 television show" and said its "moral struggle comes off fairly well, but the general situation is as patently contrived as one of Walter Mitty's daydreams."

In 1971, the film was remade as a made-for-television movie, Terror in the Sky, a Movie of the Week special with Doug McClure in the Ted Stryker role (renamed George Spencer, as in the original). Zero Hour! was also used as the basis for the parody film Airplane! (1980). Because Zero Hour! was owned at the time by Paramount Pictures, the makers of Airplane!, also a Paramount feature, were able to use the screenplay almost verbatim, including the hero again being named Ted Striker.

Screenplay writer Hailey went on to write the popular 1968 novel Airport, which revisited the air disaster genre and led to a film franchise that was also spoofed by Airplane! and its own sequel.

See also
 
 List of American films of 1957

References
Notes

Citations

Bibliography

 Pendo, Stephen. Aviation in the Cinema. Lanham, Maryland: Scarecrow Press, 1985. .

External links
 
 
 
 

1957 films
1950s disaster films
1950s thriller films
American aviation films
American disaster films
American black-and-white films
1950s English-language films
Films about aviation accidents or incidents
Films based on television plays
Films directed by Hall Bartlett
Films set on airplanes
Films with screenplays by Arthur Hailey
Paramount Pictures films
Films set in Vancouver
Films set in Winnipeg
1950s American films